Bondels Dam is a reservoir outside of Karasburg in the ǁKaras Region of Namibia. Located 7 km west of Karas, it dams the Satco River and was built to enhance the recharge of the Bondels Dam aquifer. It has a capacity of 1.105 million cubic metres and was completed in 1959 while Namibia was known as South West Africa.

References

Dams in Namibia
Dams completed in 1959
Buildings and structures in ǁKaras Region
1959 establishments in South West Africa